David Lemuel Keith (born May 8, 1954) is an American actor and director. His breakthrough role was that of aspiring Navy pilot Sid Worley in An Officer and a Gentleman (1982), for which he was nominated for a Golden Globe Award. The positive reception for this role led to leading parts in the films The Lords of Discipline (1983), Firestarter (1984) and White of the Eye (1987). Keith had supporting roles in features including Major League II (1994),  The Indian in the Cupboard (1995), U-571 (2000), Men of Honor (2000) and Daredevil (2003).

Early life
Keith was born in Knoxville, Tennessee, the son of Hilda Earle, a worker for the Knox County Board of Education, and Lemuel Grady Keith, Jr., a personnel division worker for the Tennessee Valley Authority. His cousin is Mike Keith, play-by-play announcer for the Tennessee Titans NFL football team.

Career
Keith had an early supporting role in the prison film Brubaker. He had supporting roles in The Rose, starring Bette Midler, and An Officer and a Gentleman, with Richard Gere. Keith played a local thug in The Great Santini, starred in The Lords of Discipline and White of the Eye, and held a prominent supporting role in U-571 opposite Matthew McConaughey. He played opposite child-star Drew Barrymore in the 1984 thriller Firestarter and Brooke Shields in 1992's Running Wild. He is also well known for his role as Jack Parkman in Major League II starring Charlie Sheen and Tom Berenger.

Keith played Elvis Presley in the 1988 film Heartbreak Hotel. He directed The Curse and The Further Adventures of Tennessee Buck (in which he also starred). He appeared in Ernest Goes to School as Squint Westwood (a spoof of Clint Eastwood) and in The Indian in the Cupboard as the cowboy "Boo-Hoo" Boone. He played the leading role of Nate Springfield in the 2003 film Hangman's Curse. He also co-starred in The Class, an American sitcom, as Yonk Allen, a retired professional football player. Other roles include parts in Daredevil and the 2002 television film Carrie. He appeared in the 2004 film Raise Your Voice starring Hilary Duff, and the 2006 film Expiration Date.

He has appeared on many television series, including NCIS, Law & Order: Special Victims Unit, Law & Order: Criminal Intent, CSI: Miami, High Incident and Hawaii Five-0. In 2010, Keith co-starred as John Allen, father of Robert Allen (James Wolk) in the short-lived television drama Lone Star.

Personal life
Keith graduated from the University of Tennessee with a Bachelor of Arts in Speech and Theater.

Keith married Nancy Clark, a realtor, in 2000; the couple divorced in 2016.  They have two children, Presley and Coulter. He is an avid University of Tennessee Volunteers fan and is present on the sidelines for Volunteer football games when his schedule allows.

Keith was a National Advisory Board member and spokesperson for PROTECT: The National Association to Protect Children. Keith was present during the sentencing phase for John Couey, who was convicted of kidnapping, raping, and murdering Jessica Lunsford. Keith said that he was planning on going to Washington, D.C. with Mark Lunsford after the sentencing, to lobby Congress for more support of sex offender laws. Keith gave an interview with Tampa Bay ABC affiliate WFTS-TV, and was quoted as saying:One of the great things I said about Mark (Lunsford) is he wants justice and he wants closure in this; he wants justice for his daughter. But what he really wants is to protect children and if we can get child molesters in jail, that's the way you protect children!

Filmography

Film

Television

Video games

References

External links

 Biography at CBS's The Class

1954 births
Male actors from Tennessee
American male film actors
American male television actors
Living people
People from Knoxville, Tennessee
Film directors from Tennessee
20th-century American male actors
21st-century American male actors
Sexual abuse victim advocates